The 1899 LSU Tigers football team represented the LSU Tigers of Louisiana State University during the 1899 Southern Intercollegiate Athletic Association football season. New coach John P. Gregg led the Tigers to a 1–4 season. The only wins were in an exhibition game against a high school team (which LSU does not officially record as a win) and against rival, Tulane.  It was the first year of play for LSU's second five-year letterman, John J. Coleman (1899, 1900, 1901, 1902, 1903).

Schedule

Roster

Roster from Fanbase.com and LSU: The Louisiana Tigers

References

LSU
LSU Tigers football seasons
LSU Tigers football